Arsenic fluoride may refer to either of the following:

Arsenic trifluoride, AsF3, a colorless liquid
Arsenic pentafluoride, AsF5, a colorless gas